Henry Blight "Toby" Halicki (October 18, 1940 – August 20, 1989) was an American director, writer, stunt driver, actor, and filmmaker. Halicki directed the 1974 film Gone in 60 Seconds as well as producing and starring in several other action films.  He was killed in an accident while filming Gone in 60 Seconds 2 in 1989. His widow, Denice Shakarian Halicki, produced a remake of Gone in 60 Seconds in 2000 with Jerry Bruckheimer.

Biography
Halicki was born in Dunkirk, New York, on October 18, 1940, the son of John Halicki and his second wife, Angeline Blazejewicz, both Polish Americans. His middle name was listed as Bernard in his birth announcement. His father, originally from Austria, was an auto mechanic and automobile salesman, and opened his own automobile repair shop, Halicki Garage, in 1919, which remains both in operation and a family-run business as of October 2020. Halicki was one of thirteen children, some of whom were half-siblings from his father's first marriage to Caroline Turek; his brothers were Rudolph, Frank, Bud, Ron, Edward, Joseph, and John and his sisters were Angeline, Allegra, Helen, Caroline, and Tara.

Career
Halicki moved from New York to California and worked on vehicles, eventually owning his own impound and towing business. H.B. Halicki Mercantile Co. & Junk Yard was known for its extensive antique automobile and toy collections.

Gone in 60 Seconds

Halicki wrote, directed, produced, and starred in the film Gone in 60 Seconds in 1974. There was no official script for the movie, apart from several pages outlining main dialog sequences. Halicki supplied most of the cars and used repeated footage of the same vehicles and shots of public incidents to increase the footage. The scene in which a train derailment is observed was not part of the original shooting script; it is in fact a real train that derailed. When the director heard about the wreck, he wanted to incorporate it into the film.

Halicki compacted 10 vertebrae performing the film's  jump finale and walked with a limp afterwards.

Marriage, Gone in 60 Seconds 2 and death
Halicki met Denice Shakarian, an Armenian American, in 1983. They dated for six years, before marrying on May 11, 1989. After returning from their honeymoon, he began filming his 1989 sequel, Gone in 60 Seconds 2, in which both of them would star - Halicki as car thief Colt and Denice as computer guru/thief Alaska Wells. After Halicki's death, Shakarian began dating her third cousin, Robert Kardashian, best known for representing O. J. Simpson.

Halicki bought over 400 automobiles to destroy in the film, which was to feature improved car chases and storyline.

On August 20, 1989, while filming in Dunkirk and Buffalo, New York, Halicki was preparing for the most dramatic stunt sequence in the film, during which a  water tower was supposed to topple to the ground. When a cable attached to the tower snapped unexpectedly, it sheared off a telephone pole, which fell on Halicki, killing him instantly. The accident occurred in an area behind the former J.H. Williams Tool factory at 400 Vulcan Street in Buffalo.

2000 Gone in 60 Seconds remake
In 1995, Denice Shakarian Halicki began work with Jerry Bruckheimer and Touchstone Pictures to produce a 2000 remake of the original 1974 film. The remake included the Fastback Mustang "Eleanor".

In its opening weekend, the remake grossed $25,336,048 from 3,006 US theaters, leading all films that weekend. By the end of the film's theatrical run, it had grossed $101,648,571 domestically and $135,553,728 internationally, comprising a total gross revenue for the film of $237,202,299 worldwide.

"Eleanor" legal controversies
The popularity of the 2000 remake has resulted in numerous tributes of the Eleanor Mustang. However, in 2004, Denice Halicki sued Carroll Shelby and Unique Motorcars, Inc. for "trademark and copyright infringement," citing Shelby's attempt to trademark the Eleanor name and produce replicas through the Unique Motorcars establishment.

More recently, Denice Halicki's company Eleanor Licensing LLC, negotiated a settlement against YouTube content creator Chris Steinbacher, who - under his monetized B is for Build YouTube channel - had named a 1967 Mustang Eleanor as part of a video series. The videos were removed and the car was relinquished as part of the settlement.

These lawsuits have sparked controversy among many in the car community, given that the Ninth Circuit Court decision purportedly gives "Halicki...the rights to any Mustang named Eleanor or purportedly tied to the Gone in 60 Seconds franchise." It has not been established by the existing cases whether this also applies to privately created, non-commercial replicas.

Filmography

References

External links

1940 births
1989 deaths
Accidental deaths in New York (state)
American male film actors
Film producers from California
American stunt performers
American people of Polish descent
People from Dunkirk, New York
People from Gardena, California
20th-century American male actors
20th-century American businesspeople
Film directors from California
Film directors from New York (state)
Film producers from New York (state)